A number of ships of the Armade España have been named Principe de Asturias, including -

Spanish Navy ship names